Kenny Drew Trio is an album by pianist Kenny Drew, recorded in 1956 and released on Riverside. The album features Drew's tribute to jazz patron Baroness Pannonica de Koenigswarter "Blues for Nica". This band was the rhythm section the following year on sessions for John Coltrane that yielded Blue Train.

Reception

The AllMusic review by Scott Yanow states: "Although Drew would have to move to Europe in the early '60s in order to get the recognition he deserved, it is obvious (in hindsight) from this enjoyable date that he was already a major improviser."

Track listing

Side one

Side two

Personnel
 Kenny Drew – piano
 Paul Chambers – bass
 Philly Joe Jones – drums

References

Kenny Drew albums
1956 albums
Riverside Records albums
Albums produced by Orrin Keepnews